John Saward (born in 1947) is a Roman Catholic priest. He is Senior Research Fellow at Blackfriars in the University of Oxford in England. He previously held the posts of lecturer in dogmatic theology at St Cuthbert's College, Ushaw (1980–1992), Professor of Systematic Theology at St Charles Borromeo Seminary in Philadelphia, Pennsylvania (1992–1998), Professor of Dogmatic Theology in the International Theological Institute, Gaming, Austria, and Visiting Professor in Systematic Theology and Christology in the same institute.

Saward completed a BA in (philosophy and psychology) (St John's College) and a postgraduate diploma in theology (St Stephen's House) at the University of Oxford in 1969.  In 1973 he completed MA and M.Litt. degrees, also at Oxford, the latter for a thesis on "The Theology of Death".  Ordained an Anglican priest in 1972, he was chaplain and a Junior Research Fellow at Lincoln College, Oxford.  He was received into the Roman Catholic Church in 1979.  He was later ordained in the Roman Catholic Church under papal dispensation which accepted his marriage to his wife Christine (they have three daughters). He is parish priest of SS. Gregory & Augustine's, Oxford, and is prior of the Priestly Fraternity of St Dominic (Dominican Tertiaries) in England.

Saward's published works include The Mysteries of March: Hans Urs von Balthasar on the Incarnation and Easter (1990), Redeemer in the Womb: Jesus Living in Mary (1993), Christ is the Answer: The Christ-centred teaching of Pope John Paul II (1995), The Beauty of Holiness (1996), The Way of the Lamb: The Spirit of Childhood and the End of Age (1999), Cradle of Redeeming Love: The Theology of the Christmas Mystery (2002) and Sweet and Blessed Country: The Christian Hope for Heaven (2005).  He has been responsible for the English translations of works by Hans Urs von Balthasar, Pope Benedict XVI and Cardinal Christoph Schönborn.

Saward has been described by Father Aidan Nichols as "the Balthasar of the English-speaking world". However, in recent years, Saward appears to have come to share the growing unease among some  Catholics about the nature and origin of Balthasar's theology.  In his 2005 work, The Sweet and Blessed Country, he describes Balthasar's theory of universal hope as “a kind of blasphemy”. Alyssa Pitstick, one of the Swiss theologian's critics, studied under Saward at the International Theological Institute.

Saward's work has been evolving not only in content but also in method and style towards a form which combines "ressourcement" with the rigour of scholasticism. Sacred art also plays a prominent role in this method.

Bibliography

Books 
 The Mysteries of March: Hans Urs von Balthasar on the Incarnation and Easter (1990)
 Redeemer in the Womb: Jesus Living in Mary (1993)
 Christ is the Answer: The Christ-centred teaching of Pope John Paul II (1995)
 The Beauty of Holiness (1996)
 The Way of the Lamb: The Spirit of Childhood and the End of Age (1999)
 Cradle of Redeeming Love: The Theology of the Christmas Mystery (2002)
 Sweet and Blessed Country: The Christian Hope for Heaven (2005)

Book reviews

References

External links
 John Saward's homepage on the Christendom Awake website
 Europe's Return to the Fathers
 Excerpt from The Beauty of Holiness and the Holiness of Beauty
 Two excerpts from Cradle of Redeeming Love
 Recognizing the Rose: John Paul II and the Causes of the Saints

1947 births
Living people
20th-century English Anglican priests
Academics of Durham University
Alumni of St John's College, Oxford
Alumni of St Stephen's House, Oxford
Anglican priest converts to Roman Catholicism
English Roman Catholic theologians
Fellows of Blackfriars, Oxford
Fellows of Greyfriars, Oxford
Fellows of Lincoln College, Oxford
New Blackfriars people